Mandible Cirque is a cirque indenting the coast of Daniell Peninsula  west-south-west of Cape Phillips, in Victoria Land, Antarctica. It was named in 1966 by the New Zealand Antarctic Place-Names Committee for its appearance in plan and oblique views suggestive of a mandible.

Important Bird Area
A 121 ha site on ice-free land adjacent to the cirque has been designated an Important Bird Area (IBA) by BirdLife International because it supports about 17,000 breeding pairs of Adélie penguins, as estimated from reports of three seasons sampled between 1981 and 2012.

References

External links

Important Bird Areas of Antarctica
Penguin colonies
Cirques of Antarctica
Landforms of Victoria Land
Borchgrevink Coast